Dalton Cathey (October 12, 1946 - December 31, 1990) was an American actor. He appeared in numerous films and TV series throughout the 1960s to the 1990s.

Biography
Cathey was born in Tallahassee, Florida in 1946. He began his acting career in 1966, appearing in the film, The Emperor's New Clothes.
 
During the 1980s he continued his appearances on film and television series like, Hotel, Webster, Falcon Crest, Amazing Stories, Black Moon Rising, Weekend Warriors, Dynasty, Miami Vice, Hooperman, Designing Women, The Famous Teddy Z and Equal Justice.

He also founded the Livingroom Theater in Los Angeles, where he produced and directed a version of All About Eve.

Death
Cathey died of AIDS on December 31, 1990, in Los Angeles, California. He was survived by his parents and a brother.

Selected filmography

Film
 The Emperor's New Clothes (1966) – Ragoon
 Breakdance (1984) – Producer #1
 Black Moon Rising (1986) – Maitre D'
 Weekend Warriors (1986) – Cop #1

Television
 Hotel (1983) – Maitre d'
 Never Again (1984) – Allen
 Webster (1984) – The Secretary
 Falcon Crest (1985) – Drug Rehab Manager
 Knots Landing (1985) – Landlord
 Amazing Stories (1985) – Doctor
 Dynasty (1986) – Desk Clerk
 Miami Vice (1986) – Guard Ruzik
 Hooperman (1987) – I, Witness
 Designing Women (1988) – Roland
 The Famous Teddy Z (1990) – Teddy's Big Date
 Equal Justice (1990) – Clerk

References

External links
 
 

1946 births
1990 deaths
20th-century American male actors
American male film actors
American male television actors
Male actors from Florida
AIDS-related deaths in California